Katharine Whalen is a musician, singer, and songwriter originally from Greenville, North Carolina. She contributed vocals, banjo, and ukulele as a member of the Chapel Hill jazz band Squirrel Nut Zippers, a group that she founded in 1993 with then-husband Jimbo Mathus.

After the breakup of Squirrel Nut Zippers, Whalen released an album on Mammoth called Katharine Whalen's Jazz Squad. She took part in revival Zippers revival tours during the years 2007–09. Since then she has been a member of the bands Swedish Wood Patrol and Certain Seas.

Solo discography
 Katharine Whalen's Jazz Squad (Mammoth Records, 1999)
 Dirty Little Secret (M.C. Records, 2006)
 Madly Love (Five Head Entertainment, 2011)
 Whaler's Ink (with Brian Risk, as Risk Whalen, 2014)

References

American banjoists
American ukulele players
People from Greenville, North Carolina
Musicians from North Carolina
Squirrel Nut Zippers members
Year of birth missing (living people)
Living people